{{DISPLAYTITLE:C20H14O3}}
The molecular formula C20H14O3 (molar mass: 302.329 g/mol) may refer to:

 (+)-Benzo[a]pyrene-7,8-dihydrodiol-9,10-epoxide
 Florantyrone

Molecular formulas